Veneno para las hadas  (Poison for the Fairies)  is a 1984 Mexican supernatural horror film that was written and directed by Carlos Enrique Taboada.

Plot
Veronica is a young orphan living alone in a dilapidated villa with her invalid grandmother and her superstitious nanny. The nanny fills Veronica's mind with sinister tales of witches, which she insists are real. Rather than being frightened, Veronica often comforts herself with these stories to feel more powerful than the girls at her parochial school, who mock and ostracize her for her strangeness.

Shy, lonely Flavia, who comes from a very wealthy family, arrives as a new student. Veronica envies Flavia's material wealth, as well as her doting parents. Hoping to impress Flavia, Veronica boasts she is a real witch who can make anything she wants happen. Flavia, who was raised an atheist, is skeptical of Veronica's claims, but also fearful. To convince her, Veronica takes credit for a series of strange coincidences by telling Flavia that she caused them with black magic. Flavia requests that Veronica cast a spell so that Flavia will no longer have to take her hated piano lessons, and Veronica guides Flavia through a magical ritual. Shortly thereafter, the piano teacher, who, unbeknownst to the children, suffers from a weak heart, collapses and dies, causing Flavia to believe they have murdered her. Veronica uses the threat of revealing this secret to extort Flavia still more, to the point that Flavia gives Veronica her most cherished possessions and obeys her whenever she asks. Delighting in her new power, Veronica continues to arrange frightening events in order to keep her new friend in her thrall.

Veronica's demands culminate in a request to be taken along on Flavia's family vacation to a remote ranch in the country. There Veronica announces her plan to make a poison for the fairies, which are said to be the natural enemies of witches. Flavia becomes even more terrified at the thought of Veronica's power once the fairies are destroyed, but continues to help Veronica gather materials for the "poison," requiring them to sneak out late at night and trespass into areas they are forbidden to go. When they are finally caught, Flavia blurts out their plans to her parents, who sternly chastise both girls and tell them that witches aren't real.

As punishment—and to reassert her hold over Flavia—Veronica demands Flavia give her her beloved pet dog and tells her that their plan will continue. This is the final straw for Flavia, and she is finally compelled to stop Veronica by locking her into a barn and setting it on fire, where Veronica dies in the blaze.

Release

Home media
The film was released on DVD by Desert Mountain Media on January 25, 2005. The company would later re-release the film on June 5, 2007.

References
 Steven Wilson was inspired by this movie and named a track after it while writing and recording in México for his Insurgentes album, his first solo project after Porcupine Tree.

External links
 
 
 
Tec de Monterrey Review
Revista Cinefania Review

1984 films
1984 horror films
Best Picture Ariel Award winners
Mexican supernatural horror films
Folk horror films
1980s psychological horror films
1980s supernatural horror films
1980s Spanish-language films
Films about witchcraft
Films set in the 1950s
Films set in Mexico City
Films directed by Carlos Enrique Taboada
1980s Mexican films